Khezrabad (also Romanized as Kheẕrābād and Khez̄rābād; also known as Khezr Abad Kazabat and Khezvābād) is a city in Khezrabad District of Ashkezar County, Yazd province, Iran. At the 2006 census, its population was 216 in 61 households. The following census in 2011 counted 581 people in 140 households. The latest census in 2016 showed a population of 535 people in 163 households.

References 

Ashkezar County

Cities in Yazd Province

Populated places in Yazd Province

Populated places in Ashkezar County